Flaxman Valley is a locality on the eastern slopes of the Barossa Ranges in South Australia. The unbounded locality of Craneford was originally a private subdivision and is now also located in the Bounded Locality of Flaxman Valley.

Flaxman Valley is in the Eden Valley wine region, partly in the High Eden subregion. It was named after Charles Flaxman, the chief clerk of George Fife Angas.

The Kaiserstuhl Conservation Park is in Flaxman Valley.

References